Henry Winston Holt (September 14, 1864 – October 4, 1947) was born at Wakefield, Virginia in Isle of Wight County, Virginia, but was raised in Surry County, Virginia.  His preparatory education was received at Hanover Academy in Hanover County, Virginia after which he attended Massachusetts Institute of Technology for two years and Virginia Military Institute, from which he graduated in 1886.  Turning then to law, he entered Washington and Lee University where he received his law degree in 1888.  Upon graduation, he began to practice in Wichita, Kansas, but returned to Virginia in 1891 as Commandant of Cadets at Staunton Military Academy.

In 1892, Holt started practice in Staunton. The following year he was appointed judge of the Corporation Court of the city of Buena Vista, Virginia, though still living in Staunton.  He resigned from this position in 1896. In 1900, Holt was appointed judge of the Staunton Corporation Court, where he served until 1912.  At that time, he was appointed judge of the Eighteenth Judicial Circuit, where he remained for sixteen years.  In 1924, Judge Holt was elected to the Special Court of Appeals and, in 1928, to the Supreme Court of Appeals.  He served on that court until his death, as chief justice for his final year.

He was buried near his wife, Mary Caperton Braxton Holt (who had died in 1934), at the Thornrose Cemetery in Staunton. The University of Virginia acquired his papers, along with those of his brother in law Allen Caperton Braxton.

References

Virginia lawyers
Virginia state court judges
Chief Justices of the Supreme Court of Virginia
1864 births
1947 deaths